A loan is a financial instrument. 

Loan may also refer to:


Analogous concepts
 Borrowing, various senses
 Loan (sports), a player being allowed to play for another club without signing a contract
 Interlibrary loan, a user of one library borrowing books, etc. that are owned by another library
 Linguistics:
 Loanword, a word directly taken into one language from another with little or no translation
 Loan translation, a term in one language translated word-for-word from the term in another language

Locations
 Loan, County Antrim, a townland in County Antrim, Northern Ireland
 Loan, Falkirk, a location in Scotland
 Loans, South Ayrshire, Scotland

Name
 Loan, a common Vietnamese name
 Nguyễn Ngọc Loan, Vietnamese general
 Kelly Marie Tran, Vietnamese-American actress born Trần Loan

See also
Lone (disambiguation)